Madison may refer to:

People 
 Madison (name), a given name and a surname
 James Madison (1751–1836), fourth president of the United States
 Madison (footballer), Brazilian footballer

Place names 
 Madison, Wisconsin, the state capital of Wisconsin and the largest city known by this name
 Madison, Alabama
 Madison, Arkansas
 Madison, California
 Madison, Connecticut
 Madison, Florida
 Madison, Georgia
 Madison, Illinois
 Madison, Indiana
 Madison, Kansas
 Madison, Maine, a town
 Madison (CDP), Maine, a census-designated place within the town of Madison
 Madison, Minnesota
 Madison, Mississippi
 Madison, Missouri
 Madison, Nebraska
 Madison, New Hampshire
 Madison, New Jersey
 Madison, New York, a town
 Madison (village), New York, within the town of Madison
 Madison, North Carolina
 Madison, Ohio
 Madison, Pennsylvania
 Madison, South Dakota
 Madison, Tennessee
 Madison, Virginia
 Madison, West Virginia
 Madison (town), Wisconsin, adjacent to the city of Madison
 Madison Lake, Minnesota
 Madison Park, Seattle, Washington

Streets 
 Madison Avenue, a famous avenue in New York City
 Madison Street (Chicago), a major thoroughfare
 Madison Street (Manhattan)

Green places 
 Madison Blue Spring State Park, in Florida
 Madison River, in Wyoming and Montana
 Madison Square, a public park in New York City
 Mount Madison, in the White Mountains of New Hampshire

Buildings 
 Madison Square Garden and previous buildings of the same name, all in New York City:
 Madison Square Garden (1879), the original open-air arena
 Madison Square Garden (1890), an indoor arena built on the same site
 Madison Square Garden (1925), an indoor arena built on a different site (not occupied by the current Garden)

Education 
 University of Wisconsin–Madison
 James Madison University, Harrisonburg, Virginia
 Madison College (disambiguation)
 Madison University, Mississippi

Entertainment 
 Madison (album), a 2021 album by Sloppy Jane
 Madison (band), a former American rock band from New Jersey
 Madison (dance)
 Madison (film)
 Madison (TV series), a Canadian TV series running 1993–1997
 Madison (video game), a 2022 horror video game
 Madison Records, a U.S. record label

Ships 
 USCS Madison, a survey ship in service with the United States Coast Survey from 1850 to 1858
 USS Madison, two United States Navy ships and one United States Revenue Cutter Service (later United States Coast Guard) cutter
 USS James Madison, one United States Navy guided-missile submarine and one United States Revenue Cutter Service (later United States Coast Guard) cutter

Nicknames 
 "Il Madison", an Italian nickname for Land Rover Arena in Bologna
 "Madison", the code name for an Itanium 2 processor
 "Madison", the code name for a wiki-like platform for drafting and commenting upon legislative text, first used with the Online Protection and Enforcement of Digital Trade Act

Other uses 
 Madison (cycling), a track cycling event, named after the first and second Madison Square Gardens
 Madison piercing, a body piercing at the front of the neck
 Madison (dog), an animal actress who is best known for playing the role of Vincent in the TV show Lost

See also 
 Madisonville (disambiguation)
 Madison Avenue (disambiguation)
 Madison County (disambiguation)
 Madison Heights (disambiguation)
 Madison High School (disambiguation)
 Madison Park (disambiguation)
 Madison Township (disambiguation)
 Madison Scouts Drum and Bugle Corps
 Marbury v. Madison
 Maddison, a surname and given name